In phonetics and phonology, a postvocalic consonant is a consonant that occurs after a vowel. Examples include the n in stand or the n in sun.

A specially behaving postvocalic consonant in the English language is the postvocalic "r," often known as the English rhotic consonant, whose behavior alone divides the language into rhotic vs. non-rhotic accents.

Phonetics
Phonology